Hello, Me! is a South Korean television series starring Choi Kang-hee, Kim Young-kwang, Lee Re, Eum Moon-suk and Kim Yoo-mi. Based on the 2011 novel Fantastic Girl by Kim Hye-jung, it premiered on KBS2 on February 17, 2021 and available for worldwide streaming on Netflix.

Synopsis
Hello, Me! tells the story of Bahn Ha-ni who, one day, meets her enthusiastic, passionate and fearless 17-year-old self. With her younger self, she heals her wounds and learns how to love again.

Cast

Main
 Choi Kang-hee as 37-year-old Ban Ha-ni
 Lee Re as 17-year-old Ban Ha-ni
 Kim Young-kwang as Han Yoo-hyun
 Choi Seung-hoon as young Yoo-hyun
 Eum Moon-suk as Anthony / Yang Chun-sik
 Kim Sang-wo as young Chun-sik

Supporting

Ha-ni's Family

 Jung Yi-rang as Ban Ha-young, Ha-ni's older sister
 Song Ji-hyun as young Ha-young
 Moon Sung-hyun as Chae Chi-su, Ha-young's husband
 Moon Sung-hyun as young Chi-su
 Moon Seong-hyun as Chae Seong-woo, Ha-young and Chi-su's son
 Kim Byeong-chun as Ban Gi-tae, Ha-ni's father
 Yoon Bok-in as Ji Ok-jung, Ha-ni's mother
 Kim Yong-rim as Lee Hong-nyun, Ha-ni's grandmother

Yoo-hyun's Family
 Yoon Joo-sang as Han Ji-man, Yoo-hyun's father
 Baek Hyun-joo as Han Ji-sook, Yoo-hyun's aunt
 Ji Seung-hyun as Yang Do-yoon, Yoo-hyun's cousin
 Kim Yoo-mi as Oh Ji-eun, Do-yoon's wife
 Lee Seo-yeon as young Ji-eun, Ha-ni's sidekick

Joa Confectionery

 Kim Kiri as Kim Yong-hwa
 Choi Tae-hwan as Cha Seung-seok
 Go Woo-ri as Bang Ok-joo
Kim Mi-hwa as Kang Geum-ja
Kim Do-yeon as Cha Mi-ja
Shin Mun-sung as Ko Jung-do

The Point Entertainment

 Choi Dae-chul as Park Jung-man, CEO of The Point Entertainment
 Kang Tae-joo as Min Kyung-shik, Ahn So-ni's manager

Others

 Park Chul-min as Young-goo
 Jung Dae-ro as Il-goo
 Lee Gyu-hyun as Master Jobs
Lee Chae-mi as Go So-hye

Special appearances 

 Jang Ki-yong as police officer(Ep. 1)
 Lee Soo-hyuk as police officer(Ep. 1)
 Hong Rocky as himself (Ep. 1)
 Jo Han-chul as store manager (Ep. 1-2)
 Jin Hee-kyung as Writer Kim (Ep. 4)

Episodes

Production
The first script reading took place in September 2020.

Original soundtrack

Part 1

Part 2

Part 3

Part 4

Part 5

Part 6

Part 7

Viewership

Awards and nominations

References

External links
  
 
 
 

Korean Broadcasting System television dramas
2021 South Korean television series debuts
South Korean fantasy television series
South Korean romantic comedy television series
Television shows based on South Korean novels
Korean-language Netflix exclusive international distribution programming
2021 South Korean television series endings